Luca Ercolani (born 25 November 1999) is an Italian professional footballer who plays as a centre-back for  club Fidelis Andria.

Club career

Manchester United
Having previously been a gymnast in his early years, Ercolani soon turned his attentions to football. He started his youth career with USD Classe, before moving to Ravenna until 2012. After a stint with Rimini, Ercolani moved to Forlì. He was later signed on loan by Cesena, though I Bianconeri would choose not to sign the player. In July 2016, having been scouted by David Williams a year prior, Ercolani completed a transfer to Premier League club Manchester United. He remained with the English club until the start of 2021, appearing at U18, U19, U21 and U23 level; notably featuring in the EFL Trophy and UEFA Youth League. Ercolani did train with the first-team squad on numerous occasions under both José Mourinho and Ole Gunnar Solskjær.

During the 2019–20 season, having spent time out with an injury, Ercolani - on the advice of some of the club's coaches - completed his UEFA B coaching qualification.

Carpi
On 8 January 2021, having previously extended his Manchester United contract until June 2021 in May 2020, Ercolani returned to Italy with Serie C side Carpi; penning terms until June 2022. He made his senior debut on 20 January during an away match against Matelica, as he featured for the full duration of a 1–0 loss at Stadio Helvia Recina. Further appearances arrived that month versus Sambenedettese and Feralpisalò. Ercolani was sent off for the first time in senior football on 7 February against Imolese. Following the 2020–21 season, Carpi was excluded from the Italian leagues due to debts, making him a free agent.

Catania
On 13 August 2021, he signed a contract with Catania for the term of one season with an optional second year.

On 9 April 2022, he was released together with all of his Catania teammates following the club's exclusion from Italian football due to its inability to overcome a number of financial issues.

Fidelis Andria
On 28 July 2022, Ercolani joined Fidelis Andria.

International career
Ercolani won five caps for Italy at under-20 level, having made his debut in October 2018.

Style of play
Ercolani started out as a striker, though later switched to play as a centre-back after joining Forlì. He is also capable of playing at full-back.

Career statistics
.

References

External links

1999 births
Living people
Sportspeople from Ravenna
Italian footballers
Italy youth international footballers
Association football defenders
Serie C players
A.C. Carpi players
Catania S.S.D. players
S.S. Fidelis Andria 1928 players
Footballers from Emilia-Romagna